Marcel Sabou (born 22 August 1965) is a Romanian retired footballer who played for amongst others, Romanian side Dinamo București, Spanish sides CD Tenerife, Racing Santander and Sporting de Gijón, and Portuguese side Desportivo Chaves. In 2013 he was diagnosed with amyotrophic lateral sclerosis, a disease that causes the death of neurons controlling voluntary muscles.

Escape from Communist Romania
Sabou is one of the few footballers who managed to escape from Romania's communist regime, at that time defection from the country being illegal.

His escape was in 1989 while he was playing for Dinamo București in a friendly tournament held in Madrid, Spain. Together with teammate Gheorghe Viscreanu, he sneaked out of the hotel and went to the airport. They bought tickets to Frankfurt where Sabou said he had a friend who would help them, but when they arrived they didn't have an entrance visa so they were sent back to Madrid. When they got back at the airport from Madrid, they found out that their visa for Spain was no longer available. A police commissioner from the airport understood their situation and allowed them to stay in the airport for two days and introduced them to some people he knew from Rayo Vallecano. They signed three-year contracts with Rayo, but did not play in the first one because in those times there was a rule that every footballer who ran away from the communist bloc would be suspended for one year before being allowed to play again. Viscreanu and Sabou made an agreement that they would not sign a contract one without the other, but Sabou did not respect this pact as he signed with Real Madrid Castilla without thinking of Viscreanu's situation, a fact that ruined their friendship.

Honours
Politehnica Timișoara
 Liga II:  1986–87

References

External links
 
 

1965 births
Living people
Sportspeople from Timișoara
Romanian footballers
Romanian expatriate footballers
FC Politehnica Timișoara players
FC Dinamo București players
Real Madrid Castilla footballers
CD Tenerife players
Racing de Santander players
Sporting de Gijón players
Romanian expatriate sportspeople in Spain
Expatriate footballers in Spain
Expatriate footballers in Portugal
Romanian expatriate sportspeople in Portugal
Liga I players
La Liga players
Primeira Liga players
G.D. Chaves players
Association football midfielders
Romanian defectors